The Scots Church is a former Presbyterian church in Cobh, County Cork, Ireland. It is today a museum, the Cobh Museum, which tells the history of the town.

Architecture
The building is in the "Hard" Gothic Revival style, with three-bay nave, single-bay vestry to east and a three-stage, stepped tower with an octagonal limestone spire with consoles to the south elevation. It was designed by Henry Hill.

History

Church
The church was built in 1854.
It closed in 1965, and was gifted to Cork County Library in 1973.

Museum

Cobh Museum opened in 1973. It tells the social and commercial history of Cove/Queenstown/Cobh, with a focus on maritime and military history. It contains artifacts from the RMS Lusitania.

References

Presbyterian churches in the Republic of Ireland
19th-century Presbyterian churches
Former Presbyterian churches
Churches completed in 1854
1854 establishments in Ireland
1973 establishments in Ireland
Gothic Revival church buildings in the Republic of Ireland
Museums established in 1973
20th-century churches in the Republic of Ireland
19th-century churches in the Republic of Ireland